Akulivik Airport  is located  southwest of Akulivik, Quebec, Canada.

Akulivik is located on the western or Hudson Bay side of the Ungava Peninsula.

The airport features a  runway made of gravel. It is operated by the Kativik Regional Government.

Airlines and destinations

References

External links

Certified airports in Nord-du-Québec